Porantha Veeda Puguntha Veeda is a 1993 Tamil language comedy drama film directed by V. Sekhar. The film stars Sivakumar and Bhanupriya, with  Vadivukkarasi, Goundamani, Kovai Sarala, Senthil, S. S. Chandran and Charle playing supporting roles. It was released on 21 May 1993. The film was remade in Telugu as Puttinilla Mettinilla (1994) with Bhanuchander and Madhoo.

Plot

Amudha is a hard-working woman who is from a poor family. She has to support her alcoholic father and three siblings. Whereas Ravi is a well-educated man who is from a rich family. His mother Nirmala Devi is arrogant who takes her family's prestige seriously and spends most of her time with her friends, while his father is an uneducated rustic. He also has a mentally challenged sister Mohana who is married to a jobless man and has three siblings.

For many years, Ravi was looking for a wife who could take care of him and his family. After seeing the beautiful Amudha, he wants to marry her. His family friend Valluvardasan decides to help him, he then talks to Amudha's father about this matter. Amudha accepts for the marriage but only under one condition: she would continue to work and help her family. Ravi and Amudha finally marry.

After the marriage, Ravi wants her to look after his big family. Amudha resigns her job without fuss and tries to become a good housewife but Nirmala Devi doesn't miss an opportunity to ridicule Amudha. Later, Amudha's father passes away and Amudha's siblings come to live with them. Nirmala Devi turns Ravi against Amudha, thus Amudha's siblings are humiliated by Nirmala Devi and they leave their house without warning. This incident has broken Amudha's heart. Thereafter, Amudha becomes pregnant. A few weeks later, Amudha finds her siblings in another city, the three worked hard to eat. Amudha decides to bring them at home, during the travel, they meet an accident and Amudha loses the baby. When Ravi learns of the miscarriage, Amudha is driven from their home. What transpires next forms the rest of the story.

Cast

Sivakumar as Ravi
Bhanupriya as Amudha
Vadivukkarasi as Nirmala Devi
Goundamani as Ravi's father
Kovai Sarala as Mohana
Senthil as Mohana's husband
S. S. Chandran as Valluvardasan (guest appearance)
Charle as Pattinathar
Master Haja Sheriff as Ravi's brother
Kumarimuthu as Amudha's father
Thideer Kannaiah as Veera
Oru Viral Krishna Rao
Idichapuli Selvaraj as Doctor
C. R. Saraswathi
Mano as himself
K. S. Jayalakshmi as Lilly
C.R.Saraswathi as Kumari Baby

Soundtrack

The film score and the soundtrack were composed by Ilaiyaraaja. The soundtrack, released in 1993, features five tracks with lyrics written by Vaali.

Reception

Malini Mannath of The New Indian Express stated : "Sekhar has once again chosen relevant theme, woven a fairly neat screenplay around it and told his story with humour, warmth and sensitivity" and praised the performances of its lead pair.

References

External links

1993 films
1990s Tamil-language films
Indian comedy-drama films
1993 comedy-drama films
Films scored by Ilaiyaraaja
Tamil films remade in other languages
Films directed by V. Sekhar